Victoria Leonard  is a British Classicist specialising in the study of religion, gender, and the body in Late antiquity. She is a Post-Doctoral researcher at Royal Holloway, University of London and a research fellow at the Institute of Classical Studies.
She holds a PhD from Cardiff University. Leonard was elected as a Fellow of the Royal Historical Society in July 2019.

She is a founding member and current steering committee member of the Women's Classical Committee UK, a group who aim to support women in Classics, promote feminist and gender-informed perspectives in Classics, raise the profile of the study of women in antiquity and Classical reception, and advance equality and diversity in Classics.

Select bibliography

Leonard, V. 2011. "Nefarious Acts and Sacrilegious Sacrifices: Live Burial in the Historia adversus paganos", in Alberto, J. Quiroga Puertas (ed) Hierà kaì lógoi. Estudios de literatura y de religión en la Antigüedad Tardía. 395–411.
Leonard, V. June 2016. "How we doubled the representation of female classical scholars on Wikipedia", Times Higher Education.
Leonard, V. 2017. "The Origin of Zealous Intolerance: Paulus Orosius and Violent Religious Conflict in the Early Fifth Century", Vigiliae Christianae 71(3), 261–284.
Leonard, V. December 2018. "Female scholars are marginalised on Wikipedia because it's written by men", The Guardian
Leonard, V. 2019. "Galla Placidia as ‘Human Gold’: Consent and Autonomy in the Sack of Rome, CE 410", Gender and History 31(2), 334–352. 
Leonard, V. and Bond, S. 2019. "Advancing Feminism Online: Online Tools, Visibility, and Women in Classics", Studies in Late Antiquity 3(1), 4–16. 
 Leonard, V. and J. Wood. 2020. "History-writing and Education in Late Antique and Early Medieval Iberia",  in Heydemann, G., and Reimitz, H. (eds) Historiography and Identity II: Post-Roman Multiplicity and New Political Identities. Belgium: Brepols, pp. 237–67 
 Leonard, V. 2020. "The Ideal (Bleeding?) Female: Hypatia of Alexandria and Distorting Patriarchal Narratives", in LaValle Norman, D., and Petkas, A. (eds) Hypatia of Alexandria: Her Context and Legacy. Mohr Siebeck. 171–192. 
Bradley, M., Leonard, V., and Totelin, L. (eds) 2021. Bodily Fluids in Antiquity. Routledge.
Leonard, V. 2022. In Defiance of History: Orosius and the Unimproved Past. Routledge.

References

Fellows of the Royal Historical Society
Women classical scholars
Living people
Year of birth missing (living people)